The 1924 United States presidential election in Montana took place on November 4, 1924 as part of the 1924 United States presidential election. Voters chose four representatives, or electors to the Electoral College, who voted for president and vice president.

Montana voted for the Republican nominee, President Calvin Coolidge, over the liberal third-party candidate Robert La Follette who ran locally as a "La Follette-Wheeler Independent" and the Democratic nominee, former United States Ambassador to the United Kingdom John W. Davis. Coolidge won Montana by a margin of 4.59%.

Coolidge was credited for the booming economy while the Democratic electorate was divided between the conservative Davis and the liberal third-party candidate Robert La Follette who ran as a Progressive and chose Montana Senator Burton K. Wheeler as his running mate. , this is the last election in which Deer Lodge County voted for a Republican Presidential candidate.

With 37.91 percent of the popular vote, Montana would prove to be La Follette's fourth strongest state in the 1924 election in terms of popular vote percentage after Wisconsin, North Dakota and Minnesota. North Dakota and Montana were the only two states that La Follette lost by less than 5%, so that had he won the two states he was close to winning La Follette would have gained 22 electoral votes in total.

Results

Results by county

See also
 United States presidential elections in Montana

Notes

References

Montana
1924
1924 Montana elections